Donna Beatrice Borromeo Arese Taverna (born 18 August 1985, in San Candido) is an Italian journalist and fashion model. Born into an aristocratic family, she graduated from Bocconi University and Columbia University. She became a journalist for Il Fatto Quotidiano, Newsweek and Daily Beast. She also worked as a broadcast journalist for Anno Zero on Rai 2 and hosted a weekly show on the Radio 105 Network. She married Pierre Casiraghi, a son of Caroline, Princess of Hanover, in 2015 and had two children. As a model, she became the 2021 ambassador of Dior.

Background 

Borromeo is the daughter of Don Carlo Ferdinando Borromeo, Count of Arona (born in 1935), the son of Vitaliano Borromeo, 2nd Prince of Angera, and his long-time companion, Countess Donna Paola Marzotto (born in 1955). Through her father she is related to Carlo Borromeo (1538–1584), who became a cardinal of the Roman Catholic Church, Archbishop of Milan, and a canonized saint. The family currently owns most of the Borromean Islands in the Lago Maggiore, Milan city, and many other estates in the Lombardy and Piedmont countrysides.

Borromeo has an older brother, Carlo Ludovico Borromeo, who is married to Marta Ferri. She has three older half-sisters from her father's marriage to German model Marion Sybil Zota: Isabella, married to Count Ugo Brachetti Peretti; Lavinia, married to John Elkann; and Matilde, married to Prince Antonius zu Fürstenberg. 

Borromeo's maternal grandmother was the fashion designer Marta Marzotto (née Vacondio), ex-wife of Count Umberto Marzotto. Her uncle, Count Matteo Marzotto, is the former president and director of the Valentino fashion house at the time the label belonged to the Marzotto Group.

Education 
She finished secondary education, in 2004, at Milan's Liceo Classico Giovanni Berchet. Borromeo received a bachelor of laws from Bocconi University, Milan in 2010, under supervision of prof. Lorenzo Cuocolo. She received a Masters in Journalism from the Columbia University Journalism School in May 2012.

Career

Journalism 
Beatrice was a contributor to Newsweek and the Daily Beast in 2013. Prior to that, and from the newspaper's beginning in 2009, she worked as a full-time reporter for Il Fatto Quotidiano. She continued in that position through the year 2016. She has appeared on many television shows in Italy, beginning with Anno Zero on Rai 2 where she worked for two years, from 2006 to 2008. Every week she interviewed an average three guests on political development and social evils. In 2009, she even hosted a weekly show on the Radio 105 Network. She interviewed Roberto Saviano, the famous author of Gomorrah, for Above magazine's June 2009 issue.
She also interviewed American author of LA Confidential James Ellroy and former candidate for Colombia's presidency Ingrid Betancourt both for Il Fatto Quotidiano.
For the same newspaper, she interviewed Marcello Dell'Utri, Italian Senator and co-founder of Forza Italia. In the interview, Dell'Utri admitted to have entered politics to get immunity in order to escape his arrest. Her first article for Il Fatto Quotidiano, published on 14 September 2009, was about Vito De Filippo, then-president of the Italian region of Basilicata, allocating European funds for the Miss Italia contest. She also wrote an article for The Daily Beast published in June 2012 about Italian prosecutor Nicola Gratteri.

Borromeo directed Mamma Mafia, a documentary about mafia women: its preview was released by the Newsweek Daily Beast Company on 31 January 2013. That was her sole film in the English language. She has directed several documentaries in the Italian language, ranging from topics as the women of 'Ndrangheta, selfie surgery, and the children of Caivano.

Speaking of the children who live in the slums of Caivano, Borromeo said: "These children never get to be children. They live in horror and daily terror and that seems to be normal."

Borromeo collaborated with Marco Travaglio and Vauro Senesi on the book Italia Annozero (Chiarelettere, 2009).

She also wrote the preface for Birgit Hamer's Delitto senza castigo: La Vera Storia di Vittorio Emanuele di Savoia. (Aliberti, 2011). Birgit Hamer is a very old family friend; her mother is dear friends with Borromeo's mother, and Borromeo has admitted to having grown up hearing about the murder of Dirk Hamer from his sisters, including Birgit. Borromeo broke the story of the video confession of Vittorio Emanuele, who subsequently sued the newspaper for defamation. In 2015 a court ruled in favour of the newspaper. Borromeo then posted on Twitter: "Vincere una causa e' sempre piacevole, ma contro Vittorio Emanuele di Savoia la goduria è doppia!" ("Winning a case is always nice, but against Victor Emmanuel of Savoy the pleasure is double"), which resulted in spat on social media with his son Emanuele Filiberto.

Fashion and modelling 
Beatrice began modelling in 2000, when she was  15 years old. Her mother entrusted her to her friend Piero Piazzi, who worked at the Tomei modelling agency; he managed and launched her career as a model. She then walked for brands such as Chanel, Valentino, Trussardi, as well as becoming the face of Blumarine. In March 2021, Borromeo was announced as 2021 Dior ambassador.

Personal life 
Since 2008, Borromeo became increasingly known in the tabloid press as the girlfriend of Pierre Casiraghi, the younger son of Caroline, Princess of Hanover. The couple married in a civil ceremony on Saturday, 25 July 2015 in the gardens of the Prince's Palace of Monaco. The religious ceremony took place on 1 August 2015 on Isola Bella, one of the Borromean Islands on Lake Maggiore, Italy.

In November 2015 she was sanctioned Special Envoy for Human Rights for F4D.

In 2005, she considered herself an "atheist and leftist".

Pierre and Beatrice's first son, Stefano Ercole Carlo, was born on 28 February 2017. Their second son Francesco Carlo Albert was born on 21 May 2018.

Publications

See also 
House of Borromeo
Federico Borromeo
Borromean islands
Borromean rings

External links 

Beatrice Borromeo Blog

The Journalism of Beatrice Borromeo

References 

1985 births
Living people
People from Innichen
Beatrice
Italian television journalists
Italian women writers
Italian socialites
Italian radio journalists
Berchet Lyceum
Bocconi University alumni
Columbia University Graduate School of Journalism alumni
Italian female models
Italian columnists
Italian nobility
Women television journalists
Women radio journalists
Italian women columnists